Picão is a settlement in the northeastern part of Príncipe Island in São Tomé and Príncipe. Its population is 278 (2012 census). The settlement is located northeast of the island capital Santo António. To the northeast is Belo Monte, to the east is Praia Grande, a beach, to the south is Praia Inhame and to the west is the settlement of Aeroporto.

Population history

References

Populated places in the Autonomous Region of Príncipe